The Karry Youya is a compact MPV produced by Karry, a sub-brand of the Chery brand for making commercial vans, trucks, SUVs, and mini-MPV’s, which are mostly sold in third and fourth-tier cities and the countryside in China. The first generation Karry Youya was launched in 2007, and was replaced by the second generation in 2012.

First Generation

The first generation Karry Youya was launched at the 2007 Jilin motor show as Riich 2. As Chery launched the "Karry" brand in early 2009 for its commercial van and truck lines, the Riich 2 nameplate was changed to Karry Youya. An upgraded version was released in 2012, powered by a 1.2 liter (ACTECO-SQR472FC) engine or 1.3 liter (ACTECO-SQR473F) engine. The 2007-2014 first generation models were all built with a 2625mm wheelbase and are all 4040mm long.

Second Generation

The Karry Youya II minivan was launched on the China car market in 2013 replacing the previous generation vehicle. Price ranges from 46.900 yuan to 59.900 yuan. The second generation Karry Youya is powered by a 1.5 liter four-cylinder engine with 190hp and 140nm, mated to a 5-speed manual transmission.

See also
Chery

References

External links
 Karry Auto Official Website
 Sohu news on the Karry Youya

Youya
Compact MPVs
Cars introduced in 2007
Cars of China
2010s cars